The BBC Sports Team of the Year Award is an award given annually as part of the BBC Sports Personality of the Year ceremony each December. Currently, the award is given "for the team in an individual sport or sporting discipline that has achieved the most notable performance in the calendar year to date. The team should have significant UK interest or involvement".  From 2012 the award's recipient is decided by an expert panel selected by the BBC.  For some years before 2012 a panel of over 30 sporting journalists, each of whom voted for their top two choices and followed a defined set of voting criteria. Before that, the winner of the Team of the Year Award has been chosen by public vote and picked by listeners of Radio 5 Live.

The Team of the Year Award was first presented in 1960, six years after the BBC Sports Personality of the Year award was introduced. The first recipient of the award was the Cooper Formula One Racing team. The England national rugby union team and the Ryder Cup team have won the award the most times; both teams have won five times and have shared the award on one of those occasions. Liverpool F.C. have won the award four times. The award has been shared on two occasions—by the British women's 4 x 400 m relay team and the British Ryder Cup team in 1969, and by the England national rugby union team and the British men's 4 x 400 m relay team in 1991. Teams have varied greatly in size. The smallest winning team has been two members; the figure skating duo of Torvill and Dean in 1982 and 1983, and the Olympic men's coxless rowing pair of Steve Redgrave and Matthew Pinsent in 1992 and 1996. The largest winning team was in 2012; the British representatives at the 2012 Olympic and Paralympic Games.

Six nations have been represented by the award winning team. Teams representing Great Britain have won the award the most times, having had twenty-three recipients, three of which shared the award. Excluding the 2000 British Olympic and Paralympic teams, which fielded competitors in many Paralympic and Olympic sports, the remainder of the winning teams have represented 15 sporting disciplines.  Although dominated by teams from England or representing Great Britain, the award has been won twice by Scottish teams; Celtic in 1967, after they became the first British football club to win the European Cup, and the 1990 Grand Slam winning Scotland rugby union squad.

Football has had the highest representation among the winners, with 15 recipients. The most recent award was presented in 2022 to the England women's national football team.

By year

By nation 
This table lists the total number of awards won by nations that the teams have represented.

By sport 
This table lists the total number of awards won by the teams sporting discipline.

Notes

References 
General

Specific

Team
Awards established in 1960
1960 establishments in the United Kingdom